This is a list of conflicts in Ethiopia arranged chronologically from medieval to modern times. This list includes both nationwide and international types of war, including (but not limited to) the following: wars of independence, liberation wars, colonial wars, undeclared wars, proxy wars, territorial disputes, and world wars. Also listed might be any battle that occurred within the territory of what is today known as the, "Federal Democratic Republic of Ethiopia" but was itself only part of an operation of a campaign of a theater of a war. There may also be periods of violent civil unrest listed, such as: riots, shootouts, spree killings, massacres, terrorist attacks, and civil wars. The list might also contain episodes of: human sacrifice, mass suicide, massacres, and genocides.

Medieval Times

Axumite Empire
circa 300 C.E. Ezana of Axum anecdotally said to have launched several military campaigns, destroying the Kingdom of Kush
 525 Conquest of the Himyarite Kingdom by Axum.
 570-578 Aksumite-Persian wars
 Battle of Hadhramaut
 Siege of Sanaa (570)
 c. 900 The King of Aksum Degna Djan, both led military expeditions as far south as Ennarea, and commanded missionary activities in the highlands of Angot and the modern region of Amhara.
c. 960 Axumite Empire said to have been destroyed and defeated by Gudit of the Kingdom of Simien

Ethiopian Empire

 c. 1285 The Conquest of Shewa by the Ifat Sultanate
 1314–1344 Conquests of the Emperor Amda Seyon I
 c. 1316 Early military actions
 c. 1316 Emperor Amda Seyon I successfully campaigned against the Muslim kingdoms of Damot and Hadiya.
 c. 1320 "Rebellion" of Haqq ad-Din I
 c. 1329 Northern campaigns
 c. 1332 Later campaigns
 c. 1300s-1415 Second Abyssnian conquest of the Sultanate of Ifat
 1445 Adal invasion of Ethiopia

Modern Times

Ethiopian Empire

 1529–1543 Ethiopian-Adal War
 March 1529 Battle of Shimbra Kure
 1531 Battle of Antukyah
 28 October 1531 Battle of Amba Sel
 24 April 1541 Battle of Sahart
 2 February 1542 Battle of Baçente
 4 April 1542 – 16 April 1542 Battle of Jarte
 August 1542 Battle of the Hill of the Jews
 28 August 1542 Battle of Wofla
 21 February 1543 Battle of Wayna Daga
 1769–1855 Zemene Mesafint
 December 1867 – May 1868 British Expedition to Abyssinia
 1877 – 1904 Conquests of Menelik II
 1875–1881 War with Ottoman Egypt
 1885 War with Sudan
 1881–1899 Mahdist War
 14 October 1888 Battle of Guté Dili

 1895–1896 First Italo-Ethiopia War
 1 March 1896 Battle of Adwa
 7 December 1895 Battle of Amba Alagi
 13 January 1895 Battle of Coatit
 3 October 1935 – May 1936 Second Italo-Abyssinian War
 3 October 1935 – December 1935 De Bono's invasion of Abyssinia
 15 December 1935 – 20 January 1936 Ethiopian Christmas Offensive
 12 January 1936 – 20 January 1936 Battle of Genale Doria
 20 January 1936 – 24 January 1936 First Battle of Tembien
 1 February 1936 – 19 February 1936 Battle of Amba Aradam
 27 February 1936 – 29 February 1936 Second Battle of Tembien
 29 February 1936 – 2 March 1936 Battle of Shire
 31 March 1936 Battle of Maychew
 14 April 1936 – 25 April 1936 Battle of the Ogaden
 26 April 1936 – 5 May 1936 March of the Iron Will
 1 September 1939 – 2 September 1945 World War II
 10 June 1940 – 2 May 1945 Mediterranean and Middle East theatre
 10 June 1940 – 27 November 1941 East African Campaign

Italian East Africa

 3 October 1935 – May 1936 Second Italo-Abyssinian War
 3 October 1935 – December 1935 De Bono's invasion of Abyssinia
 15 December 1935 – 20 January 1936 Ethiopian Christmas Offensive
 12 January 1936 – 20 January 1936 Battle of Genale Doria
 20 January 1936 – 24 January 1936 First Battle of Tembien
 1 February 1936 – 19 February 1936 Battle of Amba Aradam
 27 February 1936 – 29 February 1936 Second Battle of Tembien
 29 February 1936 – 2 March 1936 Battle of Shire
 31 March 1936 Battle of Maychew
 14 April 1936 – 25 April 1936 Battle of the Ogaden
 26 April 1936 – 5 May 1936 March of the Iron Will
 1 September 1939 – 2 September 1945 World War II
 10 June 1940 – 2 May 1945 Mediterranean and Middle East theatre
 10 June 1940 – 27 November 1941 East African Campaign

Federation of Ethiopia and Eritrea

 1 September 1961 – 29 May 1991 Eritrean War of Independence

Ethiopian Empire

 12 September 1974 – 28 May 1991 Ethiopian Civil War

Provisional Military Government of Socialist Ethiopia

 13 July 1977 – 15 March 1978 Ethio-Somali War
 June 1982 – August 1982 Ethiopian–Somali Border War

Transitional Government of Ethiopia

 1992 – Ongoing Oromo conflict 
 1995 – Ongoing Insurgency in Ogaden

Federal Democratic Republic of Ethiopia

 6 May 1998 – 25 May 2000 Eritrean–Ethiopian War
 7 October 2002 – Ongoing Operation Enduring Freedom – Horn of Africa
 4 November 2020 – 3 November 2022 Tigray conflict

References

See also

 List of wars involving Ethiopia
 Military history of Ethiopia
 Ethiopian National Defense Force
 Ethiopian Air Force
 Military history of Africa
 African military systems up until the year 1800
 African military systems between the years 1800 and 1900
 African military systems after the year 1900

Conflicts